The Agony of the Eagles (French: L'agonie des aigles) is a 1933 French historical film directed by Roger Richebé and starring Annie Ducaux, Pierre Renoir and Constant Rémy.

Cast
 Annie Ducaux as Lise Dorian  
 Pierre Renoir as Le colonel de Montander  
 Constant Rémy as Le capitaine Doguereau 
 Jean Debucourt as Le lieutenant Pascal de Breuilly 
 Marcel André as Le préfet de police  
 Berthe Fusier as La comtesse d'Ormesson  
 Gustave Berthier as Le président du tribunal 
 Christian Argentin as Le ministre Villèle  
 Léon Courtois as Goglu  
 Georges Prieur as Grandaye 
 Antoine Balpêtré as Le commandant Thiéry  
 Philippe Rolla as Le lieutenant Huguenin  
 Marc Valbel as Le lieutenant Triaire  
 Louis Zellas as Le capitaine Chouard 
 Denic as Le commandant Foure  
 Romain Bouquet as L'avocat  
 Henry Darbray as Le commissaire du gouvernement  
 Geymond Vital as Le messager de Nantes  
 Daniel Lecourtois as Le jeune aristocrate  
 Philippe Richard as Louis  
 Paul Azaïs as Le policier

References

Bibliography 
 Klossner, Michael. The Europe of 1500-1815 on Film and Television: A Worldwide Filmography of Over 2550 Works, 1895 Through 2000. McFarland & Company, 2002.

External links 
 

1930s historical films
French historical films
1933 films
1930s French-language films
Films set in the 1820s
Films directed by Roger Richebé
Remakes of French films
Sound film remakes of silent films
French black-and-white films
1930s French films